The 1924 San Jose State Spartans football team represented State Teachers College at San Jose during the 1924 college football season.

San Jose State competed in the California Coast Conference (CCC). The team was led by first-year head coach Ernesto R. Knollin, and they played home games at Spartan Field in San Jose, California. The team finished the season with a record of one win and four losses (1–4, 0–1 CCC). The Spartans were outscored by their opponents 25–87 for the season.

Schedule

Notes

References

San Jose State
San Jose State Spartans football seasons
San Jose State Spartans football